Anasigerpes heydeni is a species of praying mantis in the family Hymenopodidae. It is found in West Africa (Ivory Coast, Gabon, Cameroon, Kenya, Congo, and the Central African Republic) and is the type species for the genus.

See also
List of mantis genera and species

References

Heydeni
Insects described in 1908
Mantodea of Africa